Kumarasamy or Kumarasami is a given name for a male South Indians. It may also refer to:

 Nalan Kumarasamy, Tamil cinema director (Soodhu Kavvum)
 MKCE,  M. Kumarasamy College of Engineering in Tamil Nadhu

See also
Kumaraswamy (disambiguation)
Coomaraswamy (disambiguation)